The 2017 OEC Kaohsiung was a professional tennis tournament played on hard courts. It was the sixth edition of the tournament which was part of the 2017 ATP Challenger Tour. It took place in Kaohsiung, Taiwan between 2 and 8 October 2017.

Singles main-draw entrants

Seeds

 1 Rankings are as of 25 September 2017.

Other entrants
The following players received wildcards into the singles main draw:
  Chung Yun-seong
  Hsu Yu-hsiou
  Wu Tung-lin
  Yang Tsung-hua

The following players received entry from the qualifying draw:
  Bai Yan
  Andre Begemann
  Yuya Kibi
  Kim Cheong-eui

The following player received entry as a lucky loser:
  Marinko Matosevic

Champions

Singles

 Evgeny Donskoy def.  Marius Copil 7–6(7–0), 7–5.

Doubles

 Sanchai Ratiwatana /  Sonchat Ratiwatana def.  Jonathan Erlich /  Alexander Peya 6–4, 1–6, [10–6].

References

External links
Official Website

2017
2017 ATP Challenger Tour
2017 in Taiwanese tennis